Nazarene University may refer to:

 Point Loma Nazarene University, formerly Nazarene University, in San Diego, California, U.S.
 Africa Nazarene University in Nairobi, Kenya
 Ambrose University, formerly Nazarene University College, in Calgary, Alberta, Canada
 Eastern Nazarene College in Quincy, Massachusetts, U.S.
 Korea Nazarene University in Cheonan, South Korea
 MidAmerica Nazarene University in Olathe, Kansas, U.S.
 Mount Vernon Nazarene University in Mount Vernon, Ohio, U.S.
 Northwest Nazarene University in Nampa, Idaho, U.S.
 Olivet Nazarene University in Bourbonnais, Illinois, U.S.
 Southern Nazarene University in Bethany, Oklahoma, U.S.
 Trevecca Nazarene University in Nashville, Tennessee, U.S.

See also
 List of Church of the Nazarene schools